Girmit is a 2019 Indian Kannada-language film written and directed by Ravi Basrur. The film is also being dubbed into English with the same title, into Tamil and Malayalam as Podi Mass, and into Hindi and Telugu as Pakka Mass starring Ashlesh Raj and Shlagha Saligrama in the lead roles. The music was composed by Ravi Basrur, and the film was produced by N. S. Rajkumar Omkar Movies and Ravi Basrur Movies.

Cast

 Ashlesh Raj as Raj
 Shlagha Saligrama as Rashmi
 Jayendra Vakwadi as Sadhashiva
 Nagaraj Japti as Shankarappa
 Pavithra Heskattur as Saroja
 Aditya Kundapura as Damodara
 Sahana Basrur as Jalajakshi
 Tanisha Koni as Rekha
 Aradhya shetty as Roopa
 Dhanush Gundmi as Sudhakara
 Shravya Maravante as Sushila
 Sinchana Koteshwara as Sindhu
 Ullas as Pandya
 Manish Shetty as Bhaskara
 Sarthak shenoy as Maadha

Production
The film is touted to be a family-drama-action-comedy and has about 280 child artistes playing different roles. The child artistes will have a strong resemblance to the stars who do the voiceovers for their characters. Top actors in Sandalwood have done the voiceovers for this film; the list includes Yash, Radhika Pandit, Sudha Belawadi, Rangayana Raghu, Achyuth Kumar, Tara, Puneeth Rudranag, Petrol Prasanna, and Sadhu Kokila.

Soundtrack 
Puneeth Rajkumar has also sung for this film.

Kannada tracklist (Girmit)

Telugu tracklist (Pakka Mass)

Hindi tracklist (Pakka Mass)

Tamil tracklist (Podi Mass)

Malayalam tracklist (Podi Mass)

English tracklist (Girmit)

References

External links
 
 

2019 films
Indian action films
Indian children's films
2010s Kannada-language films
2019 action films
2010s children's films